Francesco Renzi (born 11 May 2001) is an Italian professional footballer who plays as a forward for Poggibonsi.

He is the son of Italian politician Matteo Renzi.

References

External links
 
 

2001 births
Living people
Italian footballers
Association football forwards
Udinese Calcio players
U.S. Pistoiese 1921 players
Serie C players
A.C. Prato players
Serie D players
U.S. Poggibonsi players